Roberts Hawaii Tours and Transportation is a tour bus operator in the state of Hawaii founded in 1941 by Robert Iwamoto Sr. as a one-man taxi company in Hanapepe, Kauai.  It has operations on 4 of Hawaii's major Islands:  Kauai, Oahu, Maui, and the Island of Hawaii.  It has an employee-owned company with 900 vehicles and 1,400 employees.

Roberts Hawaii is also the parent company for the Magic of Polynesia Show, Hawaiian Monarch Hotel, Roberts Hawaii School Bus, and various Hawaii shuttle services.

Tours and transportation 

Roberts Hawaii has a  fleet of motorcoaches, mini-buses, and vans. Most motorcoaches are made by Prevost Car along with Motor Coach Industries, including Renaissance Coaches (55-60 seats), "DL" Series coaches (55-63 seats), some "D" series coaches (55 seats), Ford-Econoline Minibuses (21-25 seats, and Ford Econoline Passenger vans (11–15 seats). The fleet make-up is similar on every island, since it is impractical to move vehicles between islands.

Roberts Hawaii currently holds transportation contracts for many of Oahu's attractions, including Atlantis Submarines & Cruises, Germaine's Luau, USS Missouri, and Hilo Hatties.  Tours, especially on the neighbor islands, are narrated by the drivers themselves. In 2013, Roberts Hawaii acquired a $21,000,000 contract with the Hawaii State Department of Education to provide school bus service for 181 of O'ahu's 305 bus routes for the 2014 and 2015 school years.

Environment
In 2009, Roberts Hawaii settled with the Environmental Protection Agency over allegations that the bus company failed to provide annual chemical inventory information to emergency responders, a requirement of facilities that use dangerous chemicals.

References

External links
Roberts Hawaii Tours and Activities
Roberts Hawaii Shore Excursions

Tourism in Hawaii
Bus transportation in Hawaii
Travel and holiday companies of the United States